Yadollah Akbari (born July 1, 1974) is a former Iranian football player who played in the midfielder position.

Club career
Akbari started his career at Tehran side Saipa FC, before moving to Iranian giants Esteghlal FC. In 2004, he was transferred to Ahvazi club Esteghlal Ahvaz. There he enjoyed a good season and in 2005 was transferred to Saba Battery FC. He joined the newly founded club Pas Hamedan in 2007. In 2008 he was transferred back to Esteghlal after having a good season with Pas Hamedan.

 Assist Goals

International career
Yadollah Akbari made his debut for Iran in a match against Kazakhstan in May 2000. He scored his first national goal against China in Civilization Cup in 2001. As of August 2006, he has 12 international appearances for Team Melli.

Iran's Premier Football League
Winner: 1
2008/09 with Esteghlal

References

1974 births
Esteghlal Ahvaz players
Esteghlal F.C. players
Association football midfielders
Iran international footballers
Iranian footballers
Living people
Pas players
People from Ardabil
Saba players
Saipa F.C. players
Persian Gulf Pro League players